The 2018 Big Ten Conference men's soccer season was the 28th season of men's varsity soccer in the conference. The regular season began on August 24, 2018, and concluded on October 28, 2018. The season culminated with the 2018 Big Ten Conference Men's Soccer Tournament to determine the conference's automatic berth into the 2018 NCAA Division I Men's Soccer Tournament. Michigan entered the season as the defending regular season champions, while Wisconsin entered the season as the defending tournament champions.

Indiana went on to win both the regular season and the tournament, winning all eight of their Big Ten Conference games. They defeated Michigan in the Big Ten Men's Soccer Championship Game.

With the Big Ten title, Indiana earned the conference's automatic berth into the 2018 NCAA Tournament, where Maryland, Michigan, and Michigan State joined as at-large berths. The conference had the strongest showing in the NCAA Tournament, where three of their four berths reached the College Cup (Final Four) of the tournament. Big Ten side, Maryland, would defeat Akron in the National Championship Game to win their fourth NCAA title, and their first since 2008.

Concluding the tournament, Indiana senior and captain, Andrew Gutman, won the TopDrawerSoccer.com National Player of the Year Award as well as the Missouri Athletic Club's Hermann Trophy. Gutman would forgo an opportunity to sign a homegrown contract with the Chicago Fire and signed with Celtic in Scotland. Indiana sophomore forward, Griffin Dorsey was the highest Big Ten player selected in the 2019 MLS SuperDraft, being drafted by Toronto FC ninth overall. Eleven other Big Ten players were selected in the MLS SuperDraft, the most of any collegiate conference, and an additional four signed homegrown player contracts with their parent MLS clubs.

Background

Head coaches

Preseason

Preseason poll 

The preseason poll was released on August 15.

Preseason national polls 

Five of the programs were ranked in one of the five major preseason polls. CollegeSoccerNews.com and Hero Sports use a Top 30 ranking throughout the season, while United Soccer, Soccer America, and TopDrawer Soccer use a Top 25 ranking throughout the season.

Regular season

Early season tournaments 

Three Big Ten teams participated in four early season tournaments, three of which they themselves hosted.

Postseason

Big Ten Tournament 

The Big Ten Tournament was  held from November 3–11. The semifinal and championship rounds were held at Grand Park in Westfield, Indiana. Indiana won the Big Ten Tournament, defeating Michigan in the final.

NCAA Tournament

Rankings

National rankings

Awards and honors

Player of the week honors

Postseason honors

National awards

2019 MLS draft

Five 2018 Big Ten Conference men's soccer season players were drafted in the first round of the 2018 draft (Griffin Dorsey — 6th, Dayne St. Clair — 7th, DeJuan Jones — 11th, Chase Gaspers — 15th, Ryan Sierakowski — 23rd) and 12 were drafted overall in the draft.

Homegrown players 

The Homegrown Player Rule is a Major League Soccer program that allows MLS teams to sign local players from their own development academies directly to MLS first team rosters. Before the creation of the rule in 2008, every player entering Major League Soccer had to be assigned through one of the existing MLS player allocation processes, such as the MLS SuperDraft.

To place a player on its homegrown player list, making him eligible to sign as a homegrown player, players must have resided in that club's home territory and participated in the club's youth development system for at least one year. Players can play college soccer and still be eligible to sign a homegrown contract.

Four 2018 Big Ten Conference men's soccer season players signed homegrown contracts with their parent clubs ahead of the 2019 MLS season.

References

External links 
 Big Ten Men's Soccer

 
2018 NCAA Division I men's soccer season
2018